Jan Amos Comenius , literally The Wanderings of Jan Amos) is a 1983 Czechoslovak historical film directed by Otakar Vávra. It tells story of John Amos Comenius a Czech philosopher, pedagogue and theologian who is considered the father of modern education.

Cast
Ladislav Chudík as Jan Amos Comenius
Jana Březinová as Dorota
Marta Vančurová as Jana Gaiusová
Zuzana Cigánová as Magdaléna
Jiří Adamíra as Dr. Tupl

References

External links
 

1983 films
Czechoslovak drama films
1980s Czech-language films
Films directed by Otakar Vávra
Czech historical drama films
Films set in the 17th century
Biographical films about philosophers
John Amos Comenius
1980s historical films
1980s Czech films